The Pakistan Universities women's cricket team is a Pakistani women's cricket team. They competed in the National Women's Cricket Championship between 2006–07 and 2010–11.

History
Pakistan Universities competed in the National Women's Cricket Championship between 2006–07 and 2010–11. In their final three seasons, they topped their initial group to qualify for the Final Stage group, but each time finished third out of the three qualifying teams.

Players

Notable players
Players who played for Pakistan Universities and played internationally are listed below, in order of first international appearance (given in brackets):

 Maryam Butt (2003)
 Bismah Maroof (2006)
 Sara Farooq (2009)
 Nida Dar (2010)
 Masooma Junaid (2011)

Seasons

National Women's Cricket Championship

Honours
 National Women's Cricket Championship:
 Winners (0):
 Best finish: 3rd (2007–08, 2009–10 & 2010–11)

See also
 Pakistan Universities cricket team

References

Women's cricket teams in Pakistan